Contra Insetos Parasitas (Portuguese for "Against Parasitic Insects") is the only release by Brazilian alternative rock band TH6. It was initially made available for streaming on the band's official Myspace page on July 28, 2008, and came out in physical format later on October 14. Produced by vocalist/guitarist/sole lyricist Marcão (formerly of Charlie Brown Jr.) and Tadeu Patolla (who had also collaborated with Charlie Brown Jr. previously), it counted with numerous guest appearances by musicians such as Di Ferrero and Gee Rocha of NX Zero, Badauí of CPM 22, Tico Santa Cruz of Detonautas Roque Clube, Baía of Tihuana, Marcão's former Charlie Brown Jr. bandmates Champignon and Renato Pelado, and Pablo Silva, who had played alongside Champignon on his former project Revolucionnários. A music video was later made for the track "Mesmo Lugar".

In 2009 the band would elaborate that they recorded over 40 tracks for the album, selecting 25 for inclusion; two of those outtakes, "Que Fase" and "De Boa", were later uploaded to their Myspace. The remaining, as of 2010 (when the group ceased their activities), have yet to be released.

Critical reception
The album was received positively upon its release, with critics praising the band's sonority mixing influences from hardcore punk, dub, rap rock and nu metal. A review from website ZP called it "a great debut, more accessible and pop-sounding than Charlie Brown Jr.'s last releases".

Track listing

Personnel
TH6
 Marcão – vocals, electric guitar
 Tite Martins – lead vocals
 Filipe Costa – drums
 Lenon Scarpa – bass guitar, backing vocals

Guest musicians
 Gee Rocha – vocals (track 3)
 Di Ferrero – vocals (track 5)
 Tico Santa Cruz – vocals (track 6)
 Badauí – vocals (track 7)
 Renato Pelado – drums, additional vocals (tracks 11 and 20)
 Pablo Silva – drums (track 17)
 Champignon – bass guitar, additional vocals (track 20)
 Baía – vocals (track 21)

Production
 Tadeu Patolla – production
 Rodrigo Castanho – mixing

References

2008 debut albums
TH6 albums